Domeothrips is a genus of thrips in the family Phlaeothripidae.

Species
 Domeothrips aruena
 Domeothrips catenulatae
 Domeothrips distinctus
 Domeothrips newmani
 Domeothrips ophthalmia

References

Phlaeothripidae
Thrips
Thrips genera
Taxa named by Laurence Alfred Mound